Ef (stylized as EF) is a post-rock band from Gothenburg, Sweden. Using little vocals, they feature a wide variety of instruments. Their debut album Give me beauty... Or give me death! was released in May 2006. They had several tours with shows in various European countries.

In February 2008 the band released their second album I Am Responsible, with a tour through The Netherlands and Germany, starting March.

On March 21 2008, it was announced on their website that bass player Mikael Hillergård had left the band.

Discography
Give Me Beauty... Or Give Me Death! (2006)
I Am Responsible (2008)
Mourning Golden Morning (2010)
Delusions of Grandeur (2012)
Ceremonies (2013)
V​ā​yu (2016, joint EP with Tiny Fingers)
We salute you, you and you! (2022)

See also
List of post-rock bands

External links
 Official website
 Bandcamp
 MySpace
 Record Company Website
 Japanese Record Company Website
 Interview 

Swedish post-rock groups